Don't Blame the Stork  is a 1954 British comedy film directed by Ákos Ráthonyi and starring Veronica Hurst, Ian Hunter, Reginald Beckwith, and Patricia Laffan. The movie was adapted from an earlier German comedy film. It was shot at Walton Studios with sets designed by the art director Ivan King.

Plot
A famous actor publicly declares that he loves babies, and soon a baby is left on his doorstep. As he is forced to take care of it, Katie O’Connor, an unsuccessful but stage-struck actress, pretends to be the child’s mother in order to live in the actor's house and to prove that she is a competent performer.

Cast
Veronica Hurst as Katie O'Connor
Ian Hunter as Sir George Redway
Reginald Beckwith as Jonathan
Patricia Laffan as Lilian Angel
Brenda de Banzie as Evelyn Steele
Harry Fowler as Harry Fenn
Thora Hird as Agnes O'Connor
Mark Daly as Michael O'Connor
Howard Marion-Crawford as Fluffy Faversham
Avril Angers as Renee O'Connor

Reception
Hal Erickson of AllMovie gave the film one star out of five. TV Guide review also gave the film one star out of five, stating that the film is a "dull comedy with little to recommend it."

References

External links 
 

1954 films
1954 comedy films
British comedy films
Films directed by Ákos Ráthonyi
Films shot at Nettlefold Studios
1950s English-language films
British black-and-white films
1950s British films